Allen Crane is an American rock band from Nashville, Tennessee. Allen Crane was formed by session guitarist Mark Warner. Warner is the sole lyrical and musical creative force of the band. 

Allen Crane is best known for its line-up of veteran artists, which includes keyboardist Steve Rossi, bassist John Billings and Cinderella drummer Fred Coury. The Allen Crane debut Broken Promises EP was eventually released on The Orchard Records.

Members
 Mark Warner - Guitars
 Glenn Ralph - Vocals
 Steve Rossi - Keyboards
 John Billings - Bass
 Fred Coury - Drums

Discography
 Allen Crane: Broken Promises [EP] (c) 2000 Allen Crane Publishing ASCAP.
 Allen Crane: "Mama Said No" [CD single] (c) 2002 Allen Crane Publishing ASCAP.
 Allen Crane: The Unreleased Tracks (c) 2005 Allen Crane Publishing ASCAP.
 Allen Crane: Sticks and Stones (c) 2008 Allen Crane Publishing ASCAP.

Videography
 Allen Crane: Hootie Hoo Hoo (c) 2001 Allen Crane Publishing ASCAP.

References

External links
 Official Allen Crane website
 Official Fred Coury website

Rock music groups from Tennessee
Musical groups from Nashville, Tennessee